Carnival Sunrise (formerly Carnival Triumph) is a  operated by Carnival Cruise Line. As she and her three younger sisters (and ) are each a redesigned version of the lead ship in the class, she is sometimes referred to as the first of the Triumph class of cruise ships. Carnival Sunrise is currently homeported in Miami, Florida.

Built by Fincantieri at its Monfalcone shipyard in Friuli-Venezia Giulia, northern Italy, she was floated out on October 23, 1999, and christened by Madeline Arison, wife of Micky Arison, the then-CEO (now Chairman of Carnival Corporation) of Carnival.

Design
Fully laden, she draws  of water. The vessel's gross tonnage, which is a measure of volume and not of weight, is 101,509.

Carnival Sunrise has a diesel-electric propulsion system in which the main generators provide electricity for all shipboard functions from propulsion motors to hotel systems such as air conditioning and lighting. Her power plant consists of six diesel generating sets, four 16-cylinder Wärtsilä-Sulzer 16ZAV40S and two 12-cylinder 12ZAV40S medium-speed diesel engines. For maneuvering at ports, Carnival Sunrise has six transverse thrusters. She was completed and entered service in 1999.

In 2019, Carnival Triumph docked in Cadiz, Spain to undergo a $200 million refurbishment. She was renamed Carnival Sunrise on completion of the refit. The ship was officially renamed by Kelly Arison, who is a daughter of Carnival Corporation Chairman Micky Arison. The ceremony took place on May 23 in New York.

Incidents and accidents

2012 arrest in Galveston
On March 29, 2012, a judge ordered the ship to be held in Galveston, Texas. The move came as part of a $10 million lawsuit filed in federal court in Galveston by relatives of a German tourist who died in the Costa Concordia disaster. Reports say that the warrant ordering the ship held in port states that "the court finds that the conditions for an attachment of defendants' joint and collective property within this district, mainly the MS Carnival Triumph, appear to exist upon an admiralty and maritime claim". Carnival Triumph was allowed to unload passengers and cargo and move between berths until a hearing could be scheduled.

2013 engine room fire

On Sunday, February 10, 2013 at 5:30 a.m. CST, the ship suffered a fire in the aft engine room. Although the fire was automatically extinguished and there were no injuries to passengers or crew, it resulted in a loss of power and propulsion. To make matters worse, raw sewage began to back up into passenger deck areas, creating a major health hazard. This caused the media to dub the event "The Poop Cruise". Carnival Triumph was originally expected to be towed to the Mexican port of Progreso. However, after being carried north by currents while awaiting arrival of large, seagoing tugboats, she was expected to dock in Mobile, Alabama, instead.

By February 11, 2013, her emergency electrical generators allowed partial restoration of some shipboard functions.

Sailings through April 13 were canceled, after which Carnival announced the first phase of a fleetwide review, to include installation of back-up generator systems on the line's ships. To allow time for the generators to be installed aboard Carnival Triumph, ten more voyages were cancelled, through June 3. On the afternoon of February 13, two seagoing tugboats were towing the ship, with a third tugboat expected to arrive that evening. The goal was to reach port in Mobile by early afternoon on February 14, but strong winds delayed the expected arrival. Eventually, four tugboats were towing the ship, with a fifth on standby. After a tow line broke, arrival was delayed still further. The ship finally docked by 9:20 p.m.

An incident investigation was then started by the Bahamas Maritime Authority, the U.S. Coast Guard, and the National Transportation Safety Board. The Bahamas Maritime Authority was the lead investigative agency, because Carnival Triumph is a Bahamian-flagged ship.  Initial reports from investigators on February 18 indicated the fire was caused by a leak in a flexible fuel oil return line from the No. 6 diesel engine, allowing fuel to spill onto a hot surface and ignite.

Two weeks prior to the engine room fire, Carnival Triumph experienced propulsion issues that caused it to be five hours late returning to its Galveston home port on January 28, 2013, delayed the ship's departure for its next cruise from 2:30 p.m. until 8:00p.m. that night, and resulted in the elimination of a scheduled stop in Cozumel because of the ship's diminished cruising speed. While in port, a Port State Control (PSC) vessel inspection by the Texas City, Texas, U.S. Coast Guard Marine Safety Unit was conducted, resulting in a finding that there was "a short in the high voltage connection box of one of the ships [sic] generators causing damage to cables within the connection box", a deficiency under 50AC SOLAS 2009 Ch 1 Reg 11. A directive with a compliance due date of February 27, 2013 was issued following the inspection, requiring that "the condition of the ship and its equipment shall be maintained to conform with the regulations to ensure that the ship in all respects will remain fit to proceed to sea without danger to the ship or persons on board". The Coast Guard Marine Information Safety and Law Enforcement System showed that this deficiency remained unresolved at the time of the subsequent fire and loss of power while at sea on February 10. This resulted in the changing name of the ship from Carnival Triumph to Carnival Sunrise.

2013 mooring accident in Mobile, Alabama
On April 3, 2013, while Carnival Triumph was docked in Mobile, Alabama for repairs following the February 10 fire, gale-force winds caused the ship to break free from her moorings and strike a moored United States Army Corps of Engineers vessel, Dredge Wheeler, sustaining a  gash and railing damage on her stern above the water line before coming to rest against a cargo ship. The U.S. Coast Guard and tug boats responded on the scene. Two workers were in a guard shack on a 65-foot section of dock that also collapsed during the high winds. One was rescued from the water and hospitalized, but the other was recovered dead nine days later. Repairs for the ship were then delayed by ten days, causing cancellation of two more cruises before the ship returned to service on June 13, 2013.

References

Notes

Bibliography

External links

Carnival Triumph Fire FAQ

1999 ships
Maritime incidents in 2012
Maritime incidents in 2013
Sunrise
Ships built in Monfalcone
Ship fires
Ships built by Fincantieri